David John Williams (1868–1949) was a British actor. He also directed one film, The Shuttle of Life, which starred Evelyn Brent.

Williams was born in Ruthin, North Wales. He was the nephew of the Anglo-German artist Hubert von Herkomer.

Williams died in Bushey, Hertfordshire, England.

Filmography

References

External links 

1868 births
1949 deaths
People from Ruthin
English male stage actors
English male film actors
English film directors
Male actors from Warwickshire
20th-century English male actors